Midianite pottery, also known as Qurayya ware is a ware type found in the Hejaz (northwestern Saudi Arabia), southern and central Jordan, southern Palestine and the Sinai, generally dated to the 13th-12th centuries BCE, although later dates are also possible.

Research history
Midianite pottery was discovered during the 1930s by Nelson Glueck in his surveys in southern Jordan and his excavations at Tell el-Kheleifeh in the southern Arabah valley. Glueck identified these wares as Iron Age II Edomite pottery. During his surveys and excavations in the Arabah in the late 1950s and 1960s, Beno Rothenberg found similar decorated wares; and after the discovery at Timna valley of the several Egyptian findings belonging to the 19th and 20th Dynasties, Rothenberg dated this pottery to the 13th-12th centuries BCE. Petrographic studies carried out on some of the Timna wares led to the conclusion that they originated in the Hejaz, most probably in the site of Qurayya.

Description
Midianite bowls bear some resemblance in form with the Iron Age Negevite pottery bowls, who in turn resemble Edomite pottery in their decoration.

References

Further reading

Edom
Ancient pottery
History of Saudi Arabia
Archaeology of the Near East
Bronze Age cultures of Asia
Iron Age cultures of Asia
Middle Eastern culture
Archaeological cultures in Egypt
Archaeological cultures in Israel
Archaeological cultures in Jordan
Archaeological cultures in Palestine